William Bond may refer to:

 William Bond (engraver) (fl. 1772–1827), British engraver
 William Bond (MP), Member of Parliament (MP) for Melcombe Regis
 William Bond (RFC officer) (1889–1917), World War I fighter ace
 William Bond (bishop) (1815–1906), Canadian archbishop
 William Cranch Bond (1789–1859), American astronomer
 William Langhorne Bond (1893–1985), American airline executive and aviator
 William K. Bond (1792–1864), U.S. representative for Ohio
 William S. Bond (Medal of Honor) (1839–1892), Civil War Medal of Honor recipient
 Bill Bond (tennis) (1876–1951), American tennis player
 William Bond (Massachusetts politician) (1625–1695), first Speaker of the Massachusetts Province House of Representatives
 William D. Bond (born 1931), American inventor and mechanical engineer
 William A. Bond (1917–1992), American big game hunter
 William R. Bond (1918–1970), American military general
 William West Bond (1884–1975), American lawyer and politician in Tennessee
 William Bond (author) (born 1946), contemporary British author